Awutu/Effutu/Senya District is a former district that was located in Central Region, Ghana. Originally created as an ordinary district assembly in 1988, which was created from the former Gomoa-Awutu-Effutu-Senya District Council. However on 29 February 2008, it was split off into two new districts: Effutu Municipal District (capital: Winneba) and Awutu Senya District (capital: Awutu Breku). The district assembly was located in the southeast part of Central Region and had Winneba as its capital town.

Sources
 
 District: Awutu/Effutu/Senya District

References

Central Region (Ghana)

Districts of the Central Region (Ghana)